McKellar Glacier is a tributary glacier flowing south along the east side of Evans Ridge into Pearl Harbor Glacier in the Victory Mountains of Victoria Land, Antarctica. It was named by the northern party of the New Zealand Federated Mountain Clubs Antarctic Expedition (NZFMCAE), 1962–63, for I.C. McKellar, geologist and glaciologist to the New Zealand Geological Survey Antarctic Expedition, 1957–58, which undertook surveys in the nearby Tucker Glacier area.

References

Glaciers of Victoria Land
Borchgrevink Coast